Priscilla Leung Mei-fun  (born 18 November 1960, Hong Kong) is a barrister and Hong Kong Legislative Councillor, representing the Election Committee since 2022. She previously represented the Kowloon West constituency from 2008 to 2021. She was a member of Kowloon City District Council.

Legal career
Leung began her legal career in the China department at the law firm Johnson Stokes & Master. She is a barrister and an associate professor at the City University of Hong Kong's School of Law, where her husband, Wang Guiguo, was the Dean. She has taught at the School of Law for the past 24 years and specialises in Chinese Law, Hong Kong Basic Law and conflict of laws between mainland China and Hong Kong.

Political career

Leung has been a Legislative Councillor since 2008, currently representing the Business and Professionals Alliance for Hong Kong. The 'independent' label she first stood under was challenged by political opponents who accused her of having the support of the Liaison Office of the Central People's Government and the pro-Beijing Hong Kong Federation of Trade Unions, which didn't have a candidate running in the constituency. Leung has been a supporter of most government bills and often crash with pro-democracy lawmakers.

She is chairman of the Legislative Council's Panel on Administration of Justice and Legal Services.

Leung was active in opposition to the pro-democracy Occupy Central/Umbrella movements that culminated in widespread protests in 2014.

Controversies and views 
On 13 January 2010, fellow legislator Albert Chan said that some people "teach dog shit law" (教狗屎法律 in chinese meaning), in an apparent reference to Leung. Chan refused to withdraw his comment and LegCo president Tsang Yok-sing subsequently ruled that no LegCo rules had been violated. Leung, along with six other legislators, then protested against Tsang's decision, insisting that Albert Chan had defamed her, and walked out of the chamber to boycott the meeting.

LegCo members' resignations and by-election 
On 21 January 2010, in a response to the quasi-referendum on universal suffrage, triggered by the resignation of five pan-democrat members of LegCo, Leung announced she would introduce a private member's bill to forbid legislators who resign from running in elections in the same four-year term. Ronny Tong criticised her move as a contravention of the Basic Law: he said such a bill would infringe the right to stand for elections protected under Article 26 and would be inconsistent with Article 74 which prohibits individual legislators from tabling bills that relate to the political structure.

A less-extreme government bill, imposing a six-month prohibition on running for election after resignation, was passed in May 2012, in the face of filibustering efforts from legislators Leung Kwok-hung and Albert Chan.

Scouts for Occupy Central Movement 
In July 2014, she championed the Hong Kong Government's establishment of the "Voluntary Scouts".

Covid-19 
On 24 December 2020, Leung criticized the Hong Kong government's response to coronavirus disease 2019, stating that it was "worse than that of the United Kingdom." On that day, the United Kingdom reported a cumulative total of 2,149,551 cases (3.233% of its total population), whereas Hong Kong reported a cumulative total of 8,353 cases (0.112% of its total population), a rate per capita of about 29 times less than that of the United Kingdom.

Primaries 
In January 2021, following the arrest of 53 pro-democracy figures in Hong Kong for organizing primaries for the 2020 Legislative Council, Leung stated that the government should investigate whether the primaries were a violation of the National Security Law.

Dual citizenship 
Leung has claimed that dual nationality is not allowed in Hong Kong, even though high-level government officials, including Carrie Lam, Tam Yiu-chung, and Tung Chee-hwa have children with foreign citizenship.

Electoral changes 
In February 2021, Leung said that a special committee should be created to vet people who run for elections, claiming that some had been voted into office and then called for Hong Kong independence or self-determination. Leung said that creating a "eligibility vetting committee" to filter out certain candidates would close the loophole. Leung also called for the education system to be run by "patriots," stating that "We need to demonstrate 'patriots governing Hong Kong' in the city's education, politics and law."

Homosexuality 
Leung is a social conservative, opposed to same-sex marriage and equal rights for same-sex couples. In 2019, she criticised the Airport Authority and the MTR Corporation for reversing their decision to ban a Cathay Pacific ad featuring a same-sex couple holding hands. Former lawmaker Cyd Ho remarked, "People like Priscilla Leung, who dare to teach law at university and get enough votes to sit in Legco, have no idea about human rights or equality."

Leung said the government should not help secure venues for the 2022 Gay Games in Hong Kong, and claimed that most people in Hong Kong would want to "protect the heterosexual marriage system".

English 
Though Hong Kong medical schools teach in English, Leung in July 2022 criticized the requirement that English be the language of instruction for a program that recruits doctors from medical schools outside of Hong Kong.

British Hong Kong 
In July 2022, Leung claimed that "Hong Kong was never a colony" was nothing new.

Walk out 
In October 2022, during a Legislative Council Panel on Health Services, Leung was warned 4 times not to keep switching between English and Cantonese; Leung then flung the document from her hands and left the meeting.

Jimmy Lai 
In November 2022, Leung said that if Hong Kong courts allow Jimmy Lai to hire Tim Owen, then Beijing may get involved to block the hiring of Owen. In contrast, Ronny Tong said that it was inappropriate to comment on cases before rulings were issued. Professor Johannes Chan Man-mun, former law dean of HKU, said that the NPCSC interpretation "may severely compromise Hong Kong as an international city," and that calls to have the NPCSC intervene before the court had issued its decision were "disturbing" and could undermine the rule of law and judicial independence in the city.

Leung was earlier one of the most vocal supporters of having the NPCSC intervene in the matter, but in December 2022, backtracked and said that there was a "strong chance" the NPCSC would not step in, and said "Apart from interpreting the law, the issue can also be resolved by looking at other articles in the legislation and considering other solutions."

In January 2023, after the NPCSC interpreted the law and gave the Chief Executive power to ban foreign lawyers, Leung echoed Tam Yiu-chung's opinion that it would only benefit the city.

Education
 St. Paul's Co-educational College
 BSSc Social Sciences (Government and Public Administration), The Chinese University of Hong Kong
 Common Professional Examination, HKU SPACE & Manchester Metropolitan University
 Postgraduate Certificate in Laws, University of Hong Kong
 LLM, Renmin University of China
 Doctor of Juridical Science, Renmin University of China

Family 
In March 2022, Leung revealed that her brother passed away from Covid-19 after earlier receiving one vaccine dose in February 2022, though the government recommended that citizens receive 3 doses. Leung criticized the government for supposedly not allocating medical resources properly.

Publications
Leung published different articles and books, in English and Chinese, on the areas of Chinese Law, Hong Kong Basic Law and conflict of laws between mainland China, Hong Kong and Taiwan.

 China Law Reports. Butterworths Asia. (1992–94) 
 Legal Reform of China (co-ed). Joint Publishing Hong Kong. (1994)
 China International Economic and Trade Arbitration Commission Awards. Sweet & Maxwell Asia.(1998)
 Comparative Studies of Family Law between mainland China, Taiwan and Hong Kong. Joint Publishing Hong Kong. (2003)
 The Hong Kong Basic Law: Hybrid of Chinese Law and Common Law. LexisNexis. (2007)

Awards
Leung was awarded the Ten Outstanding Young Persons award for the year 2000 by the Christian group Junior Chamber International Hong Kong who, in 2015, claimed membership of about 2,000.

References

External links

Official site of Priscilla Leung
Priscilla Leung M.F.

1960 births
Living people
21st-century Hong Kong women politicians
Alumni of St. Paul's Co-educational College
Alumni of the Chinese University of Hong Kong
Barristers of Hong Kong
Business and Professionals Alliance for Hong Kong politicians
Delegates to the 14th National People's Congress from Hong Kong
District councillors of Kowloon City District
Academic staff of the City University of Hong Kong
Conflict of laws scholars
HK LegCo Members 2008–2012
HK LegCo Members 2012–2016
HK LegCo Members 2016–2021
HK LegCo Members 2022–2025
Hong Kong educators
Hong Kong evangelicals
Hong Kong pro-Beijing politicians
Hong Kong women lawyers
Kowloon West New Dynamic politicians
Members of the Election Committee of Hong Kong, 2021–2026
People from Zhaoqing
Professional Forum politicians
Recipients of the Silver Bauhinia Star
Women legal scholars